Traveller Alien Module 4: Zhodani is a 1985 tabletop role-playing game supplement written by J. Andrew Keith, Marc W. Miller, and John Harshman, Cover by David Dietrick for Traveller published by Game Designers' Workshop. Zhodani details the Zhodani, a race of humans whose leaders practice psionics. Part of the classic Traveller Alien Modules series.

Reception
Craig Sheeley reviewed Zhodani in Space Gamer No. 76. Sheeley commented that "Zhodani is a great module, the best that GDW has produced so far. I rather doubt that a lot of players will play Zhodani characters, because of the happy, well-adjusted, trusting nature of the Zhodani people [...] but gamemasters will love the module. A must for any continuing Traveller campaign."

In a retrospective review of Zhodani in Black Gate, Patrick Kanouse said "This supplement provides a GM and player all the information they need to begin playing as Zhodani or adding Zhodani as opponents or allies."

See also
List of Classic Traveller Alien Modules

References

Role-playing game supplements introduced in 1985
Traveller (role-playing game) supplements